The 1934 Dixie Classic was a post-season college football bowl game between the Arkansas Razorbacks and the Centenary Gentlemen. Arkansas and Centenary tied the game, 7-7. The 1934 edition was the final Dixie Classic, which was a precursor to the current post-season game in Fair Park, the Cotton Bowl Classic.

Setting
The game was similar to the meeting at the end of 1932, when the two squads tied, 0-0, in Shreveport. Centenary came in unbeaten at 8-0-3, tying three straight games to LSU, Texas, and TCU. The team would disband after the 1941 season. The Hogs entered at 7-3, with losses at LSU, Rice, and Tulsa. Arkansas would remain a Division I program, and achieve over 30 bowl games.

Game summary
The first quarter passed without scoring, before the Razorbacks lit up the scoreboard first, a Tom Murphy pass to Elvin Geiser, who then added the extra point. Centenary back Harold Olsin would haul in a pass from Manning Smith to cut the Hog lead to 7-6. The extra point by Chester Weidman was missed, which would've given Arkansas the win, but offside was called against the Razorbacks, and a retry resulted in a completed extra point. Arkansas would attempt a 14-yard field goal to win the game in the fourth quarter, but Geiser was wide right. The game ended in a tie.

References

Dixie Classic
Dixie Classic (bowl game)
Arkansas Razorbacks football bowl games
Centenary Gentlemen football bowl games
Dixie Classic
Dixie Classic